is a Japanese seinen manga magazine published by Houbunsha which mainly serializes four-panel manga. The magazine is sold on the ninth of each month and was first published as a special edition of Manga Time, another Houbunsha magazine, on May 17, 2002. Characters from this magazine have appeared in a crossover role-playing game called Kirara Fantasia.

Manga serialized

Ongoing

Finished

Anime adaptations 
 Dōjin Work – Summer 2007
 K-On! – Spring 2009
 K-On!! – Spring 2010
 Place to Place – Spring 2012
 Yuyushiki – Spring 2013
 Three Leaves, Three Colors – Spring 2016
 Slow Start – Winter 2018
 Hoshikuzu Telepath – TBA

Game adaptations
 K-On! Ho-kago Live!! – September 10, 2010
 Kirara Fantasia – December 11, 2017

Kirara Fantasia 

 is a free-to-play fantasy role-playing game developed by Drecom and Meteorise and published by Aniplex. The game is a crossover with characters from all Manga Time Kirara magazines. The game was released in Japan for iOS and Android devices in Japan on December 11, 2017.

The game's service ended on February 28, 2023; however, an offline mode is available for players who have created game data before that time.

Series represented
In the play, each work is treated as the  written by the goddess Sola, and the characters are called . Cliemates are summoned with the correct magic  used by Kirara or the wrong magic  used by the enemy.

 Is the Order a Rabbit?
 Slow Start
 A Channel
 School-Live!
 Kiniro Mosaic
 New Game!
 Asteroid in Love
 Hidamari Sketch
 Magic of Stella
 Urara Meirocho
 Kill Me Baby
 Sakura Trick
 Blend S
 Dream Eater Merry
 Laid-Back Camp
 Hanayamata
 Comic Girls
 Anne Happy
 K-On!
 Harukana Receive
 Anima Yell!
 Three Leaves, Three Colors
 GA Geijutsuka Art Design Class
 Shoulder-a-Coffin Kuro
 The Demon Girl Next Door
 
 Gourmet Girl Graffiti
 Tamayomi
 Place to Place
 Dropout Idol Fruit Tart
 
 
 Slow Loop
 Yuyushiki
 RPG Real Estate

Collaborations 
 Sanrio characters
 Manga Time
 Ooya-san wa Shishunki!
 Love Lab
 Komori-san Can't Decline

Manga 
On October 8, 2019, Houbunsha began publishing a manga adaptation of the series by Satoru Kōnosu in their online website and smartphone app Comic FUZ, with four tankōbon volumes released as of September, 2022.

Art book 
Kirara Fantasia Illustrations was released as of December 2020.

References

External links
 
 
 
 
Kirara Fantasia fan wiki (in English)

Monthly manga magazines published in Japan
Magazines established in 2002
Seinen manga magazines
Yonkoma
Houbunsha magazines
2002 establishments in Japan
Kirara Fantasia
Kirara Fantasia
Kirara Fantasia
Kirara Fantasia
Kirara Fantasia
Kirara Fantasia
Kirara Fantasia
Kirara Fantasia
Kirara Fantasia
Kirara Fantasia
Kirara Fantasia